The Malaysia Open is an annual badminton tournament that has been held since 1937. It has been played in various locations such as Johor Bahru, Kota Kinabalu, Kuching, Penang, Selangor, and Kuantan.

The event's annual pattern was interrupted three times: from 1942 to 1946, because of World War II, from 1969 to 1982, and from 2020 to 2021, because of the COVID-19 pandemic. It became one of the BWF Super Series tournaments from 2007 to 2017 known as the Malaysia Super Series. BWF categorised Malaysia Open as one of the five BWF World Tour Super 750 events in the BWF events structure since 2018. Since 2023, it became a Super 1000 tournament.

Past winners

Performances by nation

References

External links
Finals In Badminton Championships.
TIES IN MALAYAN CHAMPIONSHIPS.
BADMINTON CHAMPIONSHIPS OF MALAYA.
ENG HEE WINS THRILLING BADMINTON FINAL
Draw For Championships

 
Badminton tournaments in Malaysia